Stafford Rural District was a rural district in the county of Staffordshire.  It was created in 1894 and abolished in 1974 by virtue of the Local Government Act 1972.  On formation it contained the following civil parishes:

Baswich
Bradley
Brocton
Castle Church
Chartley Holme
Colwich
Creswell
Ellenhall
Fradswell
Gayton
Haughton
Hopton and Coton
Ingestre
Marston
Ranton
Salt and Enson
Seighford
Stowe
Tillington
Tixall
Weston under Trent
Whitgreave
Worston
Yarlet

In 1934 Chartley Holme, Worston and Yarlet were removed whilst Church Eaton, Forton, Gnosall and High Offley were added.

See also
Gnosall Rural District

References
Vision of Britain – Stafford Rural District Through Time

Districts of England abolished by the Local Government Act 1972
Districts of England created by the Local Government Act 1894
Local government in Staffordshire
Borough of Stafford
Rural districts of England